The Robinsons is a British comedy television series that debuted on BBC Two on 5 May 2005. The show's central character is a divorced reinsurance actuary, Ed Robinson (played by Martin Freeman), who realises that reinsurance is not his passion and decides to rethink his life. The series is written and directed by Mark Bussell and Justin Sbresni. The show's executive producers include Jon Plowman and Michele Buck.

Plot
The Robinsons revolves around Ed Robinson's relationship with his family, including his bickering parents (Anna Massey and Richard Johnson), his successful older brother George (Hugh Bonneville) and his perfectionist sister Vicky (Abigail Cruttenden). After he is fired from his long-term job, Ed moves in with his aunt and tries to find both a career that he prefers to the reinsurance business and a steady girlfriend. His family's efforts to meddle in his affairs further complicate his life.

Cast
 Martin Freeman as Ed Robinson
 Hugh Bonneville as George Robinson
 Abigail Cruttenden as Victoria "Vicky" Robinson
 Anna Massey as Pam Robinson
 Richard Johnson as Hector Robinson
 Amanda Root as Maggie Robinson
 Jamie Hawkins-Dady as Albert Robinson

Episode list

See also
 Fictional actuaries

References

External links

2005 British television series debuts
2005 British television series endings
2000s British comedy television series
BBC television comedy
Television series by ITV Studios
Television shows produced by Granada Television
English-language television shows